Sitochroa palealis, the carrot seed moth, is a species of moth of the family Crambidae described by Michael Denis and Ignaz Schiffermüller in 1775. It is found in Europe and in 2002 the first specimen was reported in the United States.

The wingspan is 26–34 mm. The moth flies from June to July depending on the location.

The larvae feed on Daucus carota, Peucedanum oreoselinum and species from the genera, Heracleum, Foeniculum and Silaum.

References

External links
 
 Sitochroa palealis at UKMoths

Pyraustinae
Moths described in 1775
Moths of Europe
Moths of Japan
Moths of Asia
Moths of North America
Taxa named by Michael Denis
Taxa named by Ignaz Schiffermüller